T-group may refer to:
 T-group (mathematics), a mathematical structure
 T-group (social psychology), a group of people learning about human behaviour by interacting with each other